The 2022 Dublin Senior Football Championship was the 136th edition of Dublin GAA's premier gaelic football tournament for senior clubs in County Dublin, Ireland. 32 teams participate (16 in Senior 1 and 16 in Senior 2), with the winner of Senior 1 representing Dublin in the Leinster Senior Club Football Championship.

Kilmacud Crokes defeated Na Fianna to win the Senior 1 Championship.

St Vincents won the Senior 2 Championship and were promoted along with finalists St Sylvester's to Senior 1. They replaced Clontarf and Round Towers Lusk who were relegated to the 2023 SFC2.

Naomh Barróg won the 2022 I.F.C. and were promoted along with I.F.C. finalists Fingal Ravens to Senior 2. They replaced Trinity Gaels and Parnells who were relegated to the 2023 I.F.C.

Senior 1

Group 1 

Round 1

Round 2

Round 3

Group 2 

Round 1

Round 2

Round 3

Group 3

Round 1

Round 2

Round 3

Group 4 

Round 1

Round 2

Round 3

Knockout stages

Quarter-finals

Semi-finals

Final

Relegation play-offs

Senior 2

Group 1 

Round 1

Round 2

Round 3

Group 2 

Round 1

Round 2

Round 3

Group 3

Round 1

Round 2

Round 3

Group 4 

Round 1

Round 2

Round 3

Quarter-finals

Semi-finals

Final

Relegation play-offs

References

External links
Dublin GAA Fixtures & Results

Dublin Senior Football Championship
Dublin Senior Football Championship
Dublin SFC